Atrytone is a genus of skippers in the family Hesperiidae.

Species
Atrytone arogos (Boisduval & Le Conte, [1834])

Former species
Atrytone monticola Godman, [1900] - transferred to Lon monticola (Godman, [1900])
Atrytone potesta Bell, 1941 - transferred to Testia potesta (Bell, 1941)

References
Natural History Museum Lepidoptera genus database
Atrytone at funet

Hesperiini
Hesperiidae genera